Marocchinate is a term applied to the mass rape and killings committed during World War II after the Battle of Monte Cassino in Italy. Mass rapes continued across all the campaign including several locations in Tuscany: Siena, ad Abbadia S. Salvatore, Radicofani, Murlo, Strove, Poggibonsi, Elsa, S. Quirico d’Orcia, Colle Val d’Elsa.

BackgroundGoumiers were colonial irregular troops forming the Goums Marocains, which were approximately company-sized units rather loosely grouped in Tabors (battalions) and Groupes (regiments). Three of the units, the 1st, 3rd and 4th Groupements de Tabors, served in the FEC along with the four regular divisions: the 1st Free French Division, the 2nd Moroccan Infantry Division, the 3rd Algerian Infantry Division and the 4th Moroccan Mountain Division. The Goums Marocains were commanded by General Augustin Guillaume.

Regular Moroccan troops (tirailleurs marocains) also served in Italy but under tighter discipline and with a higher proportion of officers than the irregular goumiers.

On May 14, 1944, the Goumiers travelled over seemingly impassable terrain in the Aurunci Mountains, outflanked the German defence in the adjacent Liri valley, materially assisting the British XIII Corps of the Eighth Army, to break the Gustav Line and advance to the next defensive position, the Hitler Line.

An alleged statement by General Alphonse Juin before the battle said: "For fifty hours you will be the absolute masters of what you will find beyond the enemy. Nobody will punish you for what you will do, nobody will ask you about what you will get up to." Recent research has showed this statement was fabricated after the war by the Italian Communist women's organization Unione Donne Italiane [it] in the early 1950s. Baris Tomaso justifies it by claiming it  is linked to the perception of the crimes by the Italians rather than an official policy of the French Army.

Until 1944 the Italian government showed interest and preoccupation for the violence and gathered information about the victims. By December 1948 there were 30,000 cases submitted to Italian authorities but funds were scarce because of war indemnities Italy had to pay to France and this issue was an obstacle on the restoration of diplomatic relations with France. For these reasons many demands were rejected and the victims had to prove permanent physical damage.

Mass rape
Monte Cassino was captured by the Allies on May 18, 1944. The next night, thousands of Goumiers and other colonial troops scoured the slopes of the hills surrounding the town and the villages of Southern Lazio. Italian victims' associations such as Associazione Nazionale Vittime delle Marocchinate alleged that 60,000 women, ranging in age from 11 to 86, suffered from violence, when village after village came under control of the Goumiers. Estimates made by the Italian Ministry of Defence in 1997 set the figure at 2,000 to 3,000 female victims. The number of men killed has been estimated at 800. Due to incomplete reports of the crimes, a precise account is impossible.

The mayor of Esperia, a comune in the Province of Frosinone, reported that in his town, 700 women out of 2,500 inhabitants were raped, resulting in many deaths. According to Italian victims associations, a total of more than 7,000 civilians, including children, were raped by Goumiers. Baris considers the figure of twelve thousand women raped provided by the Communist women's organization Unione Donne Italiane to be credible; this is in contrast to the Italian Senate's two thousand women.

Testimonials of war crimes in Lazio

The writer Norman Lewis, at the time a British officer on the Monte Cassino front, narrated the events:

"In S. Andrea, the Moroccans raped 30 women and two men; in Vallemaio two sisters had to satisfy a platoon of 200 goumiers; 300 of these, on the other hand, abused a sixty-year-old. In Esperia, 700 women were raped out of a population of 2,500 inhabitants, with 400 complaints presented. Even the parish priest, Don Alberto Terrilli, in an attempt to defend two girls, was tied to a tree and raped for a whole night. He died two days later from internal lacerations reported. In Pico, a girl was crucified with her sister. After the gang violence, she will be killed. Polleca reached the pinnacle of bestiality. Luciano Garibaldi writes that from the Moroccan departments of the gen. Guillaume girls and old women were raped; the men who reacted were sodomized, shot dead, emasculated or impaled alive. A testimony, from a report of the time, describes their typical modality: "The Moroccan soldiers who had knocked on the door and which was not opened, knocked down the door itself, hit the fortress with the butt of the musket to the head making it fall to the ground unconscious, then she was carried about 30 meters from the house and raped while her father, by other soldiers, was dragged, beaten and tied to a tree. The terrified bystanders could not bring any help to the girl and the parent as a soldier remained on guard with a musket aimed at them."

Involvement of non-commissioned officers and white officers

Testimonials of war crimes in Tuscany
This attitude persisted until the arrival of Cef in Tuscany. Here the violence began again in Siena, in Abbadia S. Salvatore, Radicofani, Murlo, Strove, Poggibonsi, Elsa, S. Quirico d’Orcia, Colle Val d’Elsa. Even members of the Resistance had to suffer abuse. 

Leaflet
After the war a leaflet in French and Arabic was forged with claim that it would have circulated among the Goumiers saying:
"Soldiers! This time it is not only the freedom of your lands that I offer you if you win this battle. Behind the enemy there are women, houses, there is a wine among the best in the world, there is gold. All of this will be yours if you win. You will have to kill the Germans to the last man and pass at any cost. What I have said and promised I keep. For fifty hours you will be the absolute master of what you will find beyond the enemy. Nobody will punish you for what you do, nobody will ask you to account for what you will take." The falsification was made by the Communist women's organization Unione Donne Italiane and no such document was ever found.

Aftermath

207 soldiers were tried for sexual violence but 39 of them were acquitted for lack of evidence. 28 soldiers caught in the act were also executed. 

In January 1947, France authorized the compensation of 1,488 victims of sexual violence for crimes committed by French colonial troops.

Cultural depictions
Although the popular definition of "ciociaria" for some areas of Lazio is historically and geographically inappropriate, the term itself is often associated with these war crimes. The definition was indeed forcefully imposed by the fascist regime, although, it was just a popular pejorative term in the modern Roman dialect.Alonzi L., Il concetto di Ciociaria dalla costituzione della provincia di Frosinone a oggi («L'Italia ritagliata. L'identità storico-culturale delle regioni: il caso del Lazio meridionale ed orientale», Società Geografica Italiana, Roma 1997)See: Squadrismo. 20 ottobre XVIII. Ventennale del Fascio di Frosinone, Federazione ciociara del P.N.F. Having been imposed by fascism in the pre-war years, it has remained associated with these war crimes. The 1957 novel Two Women (original title La Ciociara'', literally “the woman from Ciociaria”) by Alberto Moravia references the Marocchinate; in it a mother and her daughter, trying to escape the fighting, are raped by Goumiers in an abandoned church. The novel was made into a movie, directed by Vittorio De Sica and starring Sophia Loren, for which Loren won the Academy Award for Best Actress. In Castro dei Volsci, a monument called the "Mamma Ciociara" was erected to remember all the mothers who tried in vain to defend themselves and their daughters.

Claims of exaggeration
Other sources, such as French Marshal Jean de Lattre de Tassigny, claimed that such cases were isolated events exploited by German propaganda to smear allies, particularly French troops. The Goumiers became a folkloric tale and stories started to be made up to extremes of absurdity. General Juin never issued the promise of "free rein" to his Moroccan troops, nor did any other French officers. The Italian Senate launched its own investigation, reaching the conclusion that 2,000 women were raped, as well as 600 men:Over 2,000 women were raped, the youngest at 11, the oldest at 86. Dozens died. Six hundred men suffered the same fate. Among them a young parish priest, who died two days after the torture suffered. Two sisters, aged 15 and 18, suffered the violence of 200 Moroccan soldiers.

See also
 Battle of Monte Cassino

Notes

References

 

 

  It praises the fighting ability in difficult terrain and "Unfortunately for the Goumiers, their military success did not prevent their fearsome reputation from taking its toll as exceptional numbers of Moroccans were executed—many without trial—for allegedly murdering, raping, and pillaging their way across the Italian countryside."

  Comments about the mass rape in Ciociaria, with video from Two Women (the rape by the goumiers)

 

 

 

 

 

 

 

 (Anecdotal allegations of war crimes committed by Goumiers in Italy)

External links

 Association National Victims of the Goumiers
 La verità nascosta delle “marocchinate”, saccheggi e stupri delle truppe francesi in mezza Italia, La Stampa
  Two Women (La Ciociara) at the Internet Movie Database

Conflicts in 1944
Marocchinate (War Crimes in Cassino)
Violence against women in Italy
Wartime sexual violence in World War II
French war crimes
Ciociaria
Military history of France during World War II
France–Italy military relations
Italy–Morocco relations
Mass sexual assault
World War II crimes